Peroxin-7 is a receptor associated with Refsum's disease and rhizomelic chondrodysplasia punctata type 1.

See also
 Peroxin

External links
  GeneReviews/NCBI/NIH/UW entry on Refsum Disease
  GeneReviews/NIH/NCBI/UW entry on Rhizomelic Chondrodysplasia Punctata Type 1